The M160 is a turbocharged inline-three engine produced by Mercedes-Benz for use in Smart vehicles, from 1998 to 2007.

Design 
M160 engines are rear mounted and mated to a 6-speed automated manual transmission. They are branded under the Suprex name. It was launched in 1998 with a single overhead camshaft, 2 valves per cylinder, a three-way catalytic converter, and a Garrett GT12 turbocharger. From 2003, it was succeeded by a 0.7 L version featuring an increased bore and stroke and performance improvements.

Models

M160 E06 LA 
 1998–2003 Smart City Coupé (33, 37 kW)
 2000–2003 Smart City Cabrio (37, 45 kW)
 2002–2003 Smart Crossblade (53 kW)

M160 E07 LA 
 2003–2006 Smart Fortwo (37, 46 kW)
 2003–2006 Smart Roadster (46, 61 kW)
 2003–2006 Smart ForTwo Brabus (61 kW)
 2004–2006 Smart Roadster Brabus (74 kW)

References 

Mercedes-Benz engines
Straight-three engines
Gasoline engines by model